Huai of Jin may refer to:

Duke Huai of Jin (died 637 BC)
Emperor Huai of Jin (284–313)